Sealy is an Anglo-Norman surname, arriving in the British Isles with the Norman conquest of England in 1066 (although some claim it originated in Celtic Cornwall prior to the Norman invasion). The name was also found among the Anglo-Irish people of Counties Cork and Kerry in Ireland as far back as the 1500s. Multiple spellings are found throughout British and Irish history: Seally, Sealey, Seeley, Seely, Ceiley, Ceely, Celey, and others. Today the surname is mostly commonly found in the United States and Barbados, while the Sealey form is more common in England.

Notable people with the surname include:
Alfred Forbes Sealy (1831–1894), British clergyman and educationist in India
Allan Sealy (born 1951), Indian writer
Alison Sealy-Smith (born 1959), Canadian actress
Derek Sealy (1912–1982), Barbadian cricketer
Edward Sealy (1839–1903), Zealand surveyor, photographer, explorer, farmer, and entomologist
Glenroy Sealy (born 1940), Canadian cricketer
Jim Sealy (1876–1949), Ireland rugby union player
Lloyd Sealy (1917–1985), American police officer
Joseph Robert Sealy (1907–2000 ), British botanist
Malik Sealy (1970–2000), American basketball player
Mark Sealy (born 1960), British curator and cultural historian
Michael Sealy (born 1971), American volleyball coach
Philip Sealy, Trinidad and Tobago diplomat
Scott Sealy (born 1981), Trinidadian footballer
Tony Sealy (born 1959), English footballer